The Copa Princesa de Asturias de Baloncesto (English: Princess of Asturias' Cup of Basketball) is an annual 2nd-tier level national cup competition for Spanish professional basketball teams, that is organized by Spain's 2nd-tier level professional league, the Liga Española de Baloncesto (LEB). It was first played in 1987.

Since 2009, at the end of the first half of the season, the top two teams from the LEB Oro qualify. The Final is at champions venue.

In 2015, the cup changed its name from Copa Príncipe de Asturias to Copa Princesa de Asturias, as Leonor de Borbón became Princess of Asturias.

Winners (ACB editions)
3: Joventut
1987, 1989, 1991
1: FC Barcelona
1988
1: Estudiantes
1986
1: Baskonia
1985

History with ACB Teams

Copa de la Asociación

Copa Príncipe de Asturias

History with LEB teams

Champions

LEB Final Four and Final Eight editions

1997

1998

1999

2000

2001

2002

2003

2004

2005

2006

2007

2008

Since 2009, the Copa Príncipe de Asturias is only played with the two top teams at the first half of the LEB Oro season

References

History of Copa Príncipe in FEB.es (Spanish)
All results of Copa Príncipe

2